Rampion is an offshore wind farm developed by E.ON, now operated by RWE, off the Sussex coast in the UK. The wind farm has a capacity of 400 MW (originally 700 MW was planned). The wind farm was commissioned in April 2018 and was the first offshore wind farm for the whole south coast of England.

Location

Name

Initially known as Zone 6 off the Sussex coast, it was later named the "Southern Array" (Hastings).

When the site of the wind farm was changed from near Hastings to off Brighton, E.ON held a competition with local schools to suggest a new name as a public relations exercise.  The name ‘Rampion’ was voted the winning suggestion, submitted by Davison High School Pupil Megan McCullough, after the round-headed rampion (Phyteuma orbiculare), also known as the Pride of Sussex, the county flower of Sussex.

Planning

Development and construction costs were estimated at £2 billion. As the turbines are designed to last approximately 20–25 years, and since E.ON's lease of the site from the Crown Estate is for 50 years, the company would eventually need to replace the turbines.

After an 18 month evaluation process between Newhaven and Shoreham ports, E.ON chose Newhaven as the base for its Operations and Maintenance facility. The company took a lease on a site at the Port of Newhaven, where they constructed two new buildings to house the administration and engineering functions of the wind farm. The site and associated buildings will act as the combined servicing point for the wind farm.

The project was approved by the Government in July 2014. In November 2014, E.ON announced that it had reduced the proposed capacity of the project by approximately 40%.
Onshore construction work began in June 2015 with construction of a new electricity substation adjacent to the existing National Grid Bolney 400/132kV substation near Twineham. 
Off shore the 116 monopile foundations were piled into the sea bed and on completion of this the first wind turbine was lifted into place in March 2017. Coincident with this was the ongoing work to backfill the cable duct trenches off Lancing beach initially due to be completed in Spring 2017. Installation of the remainder of the 150kV cable through to Bolney and the burying in the sea bed of the 33kV inter array cables was also completed during this time following the installation of a 2,000 tonne offshore 33/150kV substation that was completed in April 2017.  An excavator was stranded and disabled after completing cable trench backfilling work in April 2017; it was removed in June 2017. Electricity production commenced during November 2017. Construction of the wind farm was completed in 2018 at a cost of £1.3 billion.

Rampion 2 
Rampion 2 is a proposed second wind farm to the immediate south west of the current Rampion installation. Plans include larger wind turbines compared with the first Rampion wind farm, producing up to 1,200 megawatts of power. If plans are approved construction could start in 2026.

See also

List of offshore wind farms in the United Kingdom
Wind power in the United Kingdom

References

External links

Rampion Offshore Wind Farm, E.ON
Rampion Offshore Wind Farm. 4C
Rampion 2 

Offshore wind farms
Wind farms in England
Power stations in South East England
Environment of Sussex
E.ON
Round 3 offshore wind farms
Energy infrastructure completed in 2018
2018 establishments in England